Julieta da Graça Pinto do Espírito Santo (died 2 January 2008) was a São Toméan physician and politician. The first female doctor in the country, she was also one of the first group of female members of National Assembly in 1975.

Biography
Graça entered the Instituto de Odivelas boarding school in Portugal in 1933. She later studied medicine and surgery at the University of Coimbra, returning to São Tomé in 1955 as the first female doctor in the territory. After independence in 1975 she became director general of health services and also co-ordinated World Health Organization programmes in the islands.

In December 1975 Graça was appointed to the National Assembly as one of the first group of six women in the legislature. She later also served in parliament for Independent Democratic Action.

She died in January 2008 at the age of 86.

References

Date of birth unknown
University of Coimbra alumni
São Tomé and Príncipe physicians
São Tomé and Príncipe women in politics
Members of the National Assembly (São Tomé and Príncipe)
Movement for the Liberation of São Tomé and Príncipe/Social Democratic Party politicians
Independent Democratic Action politicians
2008 deaths
20th-century São Tomé and Príncipe politicians
20th-century women politicians